Malalí is an extinct Maxakalian language of Brazil.

Distribution
Malali was historically spoken in an area between the Jequitinhonha River, Araçuaí River, and Suaçuí Grande River near Minas Novas, Minas Gerais.

References 

Maxakalían languages
Extinct languages of South America
Languages of Brazil